Jules Favre (born 22 March 1999) is a French rugby union player, who plays for Stade Rochelais.

He was first selected for the French national rugby team in January 2022, for the following Six Nations tournament.

Honours

Club 
 La Rochelle
European Rugby Champions Cup: 2021–2022

References

External link
Stade rochelais profile

1999 births
People from La Seyne-sur-Mer
Living people
French rugby union players
Rugby union centres
Rugby union wings
Stade Rochelais players
Sportspeople from Var (department)